Hakea lasiantha, commonly known as the woolly-flowered hakea, is a shrub in the family  Proteacea endemic  to an area along the south coast in the South West and Great Southern regions of Western Australia.

Description
It blooms from May to September and produces white flowers and have woolly white or yellowish brown perianths with a deep red style in clusters in the leaf axils. The smooth narrowly elliptic fruit are normally 2.5–3 cm (1 inch) long and only a slight beak.

Taxonomy and naming
Hakea lasiantha was first formally described by Scottish botanist Robert Brown in 1830. The specific name is derived from ancient Greek words lasios (λάσιος) meaning "shaggy" and anthos (ἄνθος) meaning flower, referring to the woolly flower structure.

Distribution and habitat
This species prefers low lying wet depressions from the Stirling Range to Albany and along the coast to Ravensthorpe. Grows on sandy loam and gravel in heath and scrubland. It prefers a well-drained site with a sunny aspect and withstands salt laden winds. A good shade tree and windbreak  that tolerates frost.

Conservation status
Hakea lasiantha is classified as "not threatened" by the Western Australian Government.

References

lasiantha
Eudicots of Western Australia
Plants described in 1830
Taxa named by Robert Brown (botanist, born 1773)